Kathy Kirby (born Catherine Ethel O'Rourke; 20 October 1938 – 19 May 2011) was an English singer. She is best known for her cover version of Doris Day's "Secret Love" and for representing the United Kingdom in the 1965 Eurovision Song Contest where she finished in second place. Her popularity peaked in the 1960s, when she was one of the best-known and most-recognised personalities in British show business.

Early life
Kirby was born in Ilford, Essex, later part of Greater London, the eldest of three children of Irish parents. Her mother Eileen brought them up alone after their father left early in their childhood. Kirby grew up on Tomswood Hill, Barkingside, in Ilford, and attended the Ursuline Convent School where she sang in the choir.

Career
Kirby's vocal talent became apparent early in life, and she took singing lessons with a view to becoming an opera singer. She became a professional singer after meeting bandleader Bert Ambrose at the Ilford Palais in 1956. She remained with Ambrose's band for three years and he remained her manager, mentor and lover until his death on stage in Leeds in 1971.

During the summer of 1957, Kirby performed at the Florida Park Restaurant in Madrid, and after returning to the UK not only performed with Ambrose's orchestra, but also with Nat Allen and his band. In 1959, Kirby joined vocalists Tony Mansell and Rikki Henderson in the Denny Boyce Band, and appeared regularly at the Lyceum Ballroom in London. In the summer of 1959, she made her solo cabaret debut at the Astor Club, and starred in the film The Shakedown (1959 film), in which she sang the theme song in a nightclub scene, which was also used during the closing credits. She subsequently signed to Pye Records in 1960, for which she released two singles, "Love Can Be" and "Now You're Crying". They sold few copies but helped her get a six-month contract at Mayfair's Blue Angel nightclub. She adopted a "blonde bombshell" look and was compared to Marilyn Monroe.

In 1962, she signed a contract with Decca Records, for which her first single was "(He's a) Big Man", released in October 1962. It sold well over a long period of time, but failed to reach the British charts. However, it was a hit in Vancouver's CFUN in January 1963. In the summer of 1963, after becoming a regular on the musical TV program Stars and Garters, she had her first hit, "Dance On!", which peaked at No. 11 in the UK chart and No. 1 in Australia. Its follow-up was an upbeat reworking of the Doris Day classic "Secret Love", which peaked at No. 4 on the UK Singles Chart. In the same year, she won Top British Female Singer in the New Musical Express poll. Her album 16 Hits From Stars & Garters was released at the end of 1963, and cracked the top 20. The single "Let Me Go, Lover!", another upbeat reworking, this time of the classic by Joan Weber, reached No. 10 in early 1964. Kirby disliked the song, stating that: "Honestly, I was really surprised because I never had much hope for this record, and when I recorded it I thought it might never get anywhere at all."

"Let Me Go, Lover!" was followed by "You're The One", which peaked at No. 17 in May 1964. That success was followed by a record-breaking summer season show at the ABC Theatre in Blackpool.

Kirby became one of the biggest stars of the early to mid-1960s, appearing in the Royal Command Variety Performance and two television series for BBC TV. She represented the United Kingdom in the Eurovision Song Contest in 1965 and came second with the song "I Belong" which also became a hit. Author and historian John Kennedy O'Connor describes Kirby's "I Belong" as being far more representative of current musical tastes than other songs from the contest, but she was beaten by France Gall from France and representing Luxembourg, singing an even more contemporary song written by Serge Gainsbourg. An EP was issued featuring the six songs selected for the Eurovision Contest, featuring a different version of "I Belong", which peaked at No. 10 in 1965. An Italian version of I Belong was recorded by her under the title Tu Sei Con Me. She also sang the theme tune of the BBC television series Adam Adamant Lives!.

In September 1965 her single "The Way of Love" charted at No. 88 on the US Billboard Top 100. The song also charted in some of the regional charts, such as No. 35 in New York, No. 16 in Philadelphia, No. 39 in Detroit, No. 39 in Washington, and No. 38 in Los Angeles.

After the chart success of "I Belong", Kirby recorded more than a dozen singles between 1965 and 1967, but they all failed to chart. She continued to make television appearances, and her 1975 appearance on The Wheeltappers and Shunters Social Club, (where she sang 'You Won't Find Another Fool Like Me'),  is now available to watch again on 'YouTube'; (there had been a copyright dispute which removed it from view for some time).

During the 1970s, Kirby's singing career was eclipsed by a turbulent personal life, but she continued to perform live at smaller venues and made occasional television appearances and performed a few live concerts on the "nostalgia circuit". On 31 December 1976, she performed her hit song "Secret Love" on BBC1's A Jubilee of Music, celebrating British pop music for Queen Elizabeth II's impending Silver Jubilee.

Her final single "He" was released in March 1981, at which time she was interviewed by Simon Reed for ITV. The interview focussed on her attempted comeback after a difficult decade personally and professionally. 

In December 1983, she gave one last concert in Blackpool, then retired from show business altogether.

Post-retirement
She did not perform in public after her retirement, but interest in Kirby and her work continued, particularly among gay men, for whom she was something of an icon. In her last decade, she recorded short greetings for her official website. A biography was published in 2005, and there was a 2008 stage show about her life, written and produced by Graham Smith, called Secret Love. Smith re-wrote the show for the 2012 Haworth Festival, entitling it: Dance On: The Kathy Kirby Story.

The Daily Express reported in 2008 that plans for a newly filmed interview had been abandoned, but later reports confirmed that the interview had been filmed, and it was subsequently included on a DVD compilation released the following year. She also gave an interview to the Express in 2009, which included recent photographs and was billed as her first in 26 years.

Following the 2009 interview, the Sunday Express reported that some previously unreleased recordings would be made available on CD in 2010, and that Kirby had been approached to appear on Desert Island Discs, although neither the programme nor the CD has been released.

Personal life
Kirby met bandleader Bert Ambrose in her teens and, despite his being 42 years older and having an estranged wife at the time, began a relationship with him that lasted until his death in 1971. In the 2009 interview, she said she had had an affair with Bruce Forsyth during this time.

Kirby was married briefly to writer and former London policeman Frederick Pye in the 1970s. Following her bankruptcy in 1975 and a court case following an arrest over an unpaid hotel bill, she was referred to St Luke's psychiatric hospital in London in 1979. Following her discharge, she lived with a female fan, Laraine McKay. McKay was imprisoned for fraud and forgery. In the early 1980s Kirby had relationships with musician David Cross and lawyer Alan Porter.

Kirby was diagnosed with schizophrenia and was in poor physical and mental health for much of her life. After her retirement she lived in a series of apartments and hotels in west London, settling in an apartment in Emperor's Gate, South Kensington, surviving on state benefits and some royalties, and maintaining what has been called a "Garbo-esque" seclusion.  Shortly before her death, Kirby moved to Brinsworth House in Twickenham at the insistence of her niece Sarah, Lady Thatcher, wife of Mark Thatcher.

Kirby died on 19 May 2011, a few days after moving to Brinsworth House.  According to a message posted by a relative on a fan website, she had a heart attack. She was survived by her sister Pat and her brother Douglas.

BBC TV series

The Kathy Kirby Show - Series 1

The Kathy Kirby Show - Series 2

TV Specials

Discography

Singles (UK)

Note: Kirby had one charted single on the US Billboard Hot 100.  "The Way of Love" peaked at No. 88 in 1965; Cher also recorded the track.

Albums

See also
 List of number-one singles in Australia during the 1960s
 List of artists who reached number one on the Australian singles chart
 List of performers on Top of the Pops
 List of artists under the Decca Records label
 Royal Variety Performance
 United Kingdom in the Eurovision Song Contest 1965
 United Kingdom in the Eurovision Song Contest
 Eurovision Song Contest 1965
 Singer With The Band - Rare recording

References

Further reading

External links
 

1938 births
2011 deaths
Eurovision Song Contest entrants for the United Kingdom
Decca Records artists
English people of Irish descent
Eurovision Song Contest entrants of 1965
People from Ilford
People with schizophrenia
Traditional pop music singers
Kirby, Kathy